Church of the Divine Providence may refer to:
 Iglesia de la Divina Providencia
 Our Lady of Divine Providence Church, Providenciales
 Cathedral of Divine Providence, Chișinău